The Parks Police Service was a small constabulary responsible for policing 87 parks and open spaces in the boroughs of Kensington and Chelsea and Hammersmith and Fulham. The police force was created through the merger of Hammersmith and Fulham Parks Constabulary and Royal Borough of Kensington and Chelsea Parks Police in 2013. In 2019, the respective councils of Hammersmith & Fulham and Kengsinton & Chelsea disaggregated their shared some of their services, including the Parks Police. As such, the Parks Police Service ceased to exist and the Royal Borough of Kensington and Chelsea Parks Police and the Hammersmith and Fulham Parks Constabulary came back into existence.

Powers
Members of the constabulary were sworn as constables under section 18, Ministry of Housing and Local Government Provision Order Confirmation (Greater London Parks and Open Spaces) Act 1967. Such constables have the powers of a constable to deal with by-laws relating to parks and open spaces under their control.

Staffing
The Parks Police Service was staffed by one police inspector, five police sergeants and thirty constables.

The Metropolitan Police Service worked alongside the Parks Police Service, especially assisting with serious crimes.

Cessation 
In July 2019, the Royal Borough of Kensington and Chelsea Parks Police service disaggregated with The London Borough of Hammersmith and Fulham Parks constabulary, for once again both councils having their own sovereign service.

See also
Law enforcement in the United Kingdom
Hammersmith and Fulham Parks Constabulary
Royal Borough of Kensington and Chelsea Parks Police
List of law enforcement agencies in the United Kingdom, Crown Dependencies and British Overseas Territories

References

Defunct park police forces of the United Kingdom
2013 establishments in England
Park police forces of London